"Es ist geil ein Arschloch zu sein" is the debut single of German singer and Big Brother Germany contestant .

Hansa Records and BMG Berlin issued the song as a CD single on 13 November 2000. The single was a success in German-speaking Europe, peaking atop the German Singles Chart for eight weeks in 2000 and 2001 while becoming a top-10 hit in Austria and Switzerland. The song is certified platinum in Germany for shipping over 500,000 units and was the 40th-most-success hit of the 2000s decade there.

Background
In 2000, 28-year-old  was cast as a housemate on the German incarnation of the reality television programme Big Brother for its second series. Shortly after the series started, he designated himself the "Nominator" and displayed rude behaviour toward the other contestants, especially Hanka Rackwitz, and talked about himself narcissistically while also attracting criticism for his bad acting. After a month, he left the show, but his snarky attitude had left an impression across Germany. Using his popularity as a springboard, Christian recorded and released his debut single, "Es ist geil ein Arschloch zu sein", soon after he departed the programme.

Release and reception
The only commercial format released, a CD single, contains three tracks: the radio edit of "Es ist geil ein Arschloch zu sein", a "Nominator" version of the song, and an extra B-side track titled "Badman". Hansa Records and BMG Berlin issued the CD across German-speaking Europe on 13 November 2000. The single immediately debuted atop the German Singles Chart on 27 November, remaining at number one for eight consecutive weeks, until 29 January 2001, when it slipped to number two. Afterwards, the song spent seven more weeks in the top 100 before leaving the chart. "Arschloch" was Germany's 45th-most-successful single of 2000 and the 29th-most-successful single of 2001, shipping over 500,000 copies to earn a platinum sales certification from the Bundesverband Musikindustrie (BVMI). In 2009, the song was ranked at number 40 on the German decade-end chart.

The song also charted in Austria and Switzerland. In the former country, "Arschloch" debuted at number 17 on 3 December 2000. After remaining at that position for another week, the song gradually rose up the Ö3 Austria Top 40 until peaking at number three on 28 January 2001. It then spent eight more weeks on the chart, totalling 16 weeks within the top 75, the most weeks out of all the countries in which it charted. At the end of 2001, Ö3 ranked the song at number 23 on their year-end ranking. Seven days after its Austrian debut, "Arschloch" appeared on the Swiss Singles Chart at number 40. The single rose and fell over the next three issues, reaching its peak of number seven during its fifth week on the chart, on 14 January 2001. Afterwards, the song descended the listing and left the top 100 after 14 weeks, ending 2001 as Switzerland's 85th-best-selling single. On the Eurochart Hot 100, the song reached number nine on 20 January 2001, finishing the year as Europe's 71st-most-successful track.

Credits and personnel
Credits are lifted from the CD single liner notes.

Studios
 Produced and mixed at Studio Planet 4 (Hamburg, Germany)
 Nominator mix remixed at Studio Planet 3 (Hamburg, Germany)

Personnel

 Steve van Velvet – music and lyrics
 Christian – vocals
  – production, mixing, music and lyrics ("Badman")
 Ronald Reinsberg – artwork

 F.L. Lange – photography
 Dirk van Gercum – music ("Badman")
 Lukas Loules – lyrics ("Badman")
 Hayo Panarinfo – lyrics ("Badman")

Charts

Weekly charts

Decade-end charts

Year-end charts

Certifications

References

2000 debut singles
2000 songs
Bertelsmann Music Group albums
German-language songs
Hansa Records singles
Number-one singles in Germany